Antheraea korintjiana is a moth of the family Saturniidae first described by Eugène Louis Bouvier in 1928. It is found in Borneo, Sumatra and Peninsular Malaysia. The larvae probably feed on Betula, Cyperus, Daphniphyllum, Quercus, Malus, Prunus, Pyrus, and Euodia.

External links

Antheraea
Moths of Asia
Moths described in 1928
Taxa named by Eugène Louis Bouvier